James McAvoy (born 21 April 1979) is a Scottish actor. He made his acting debut as a teen in The Near Room (1995) and appeared mostly on television until 2003, when his feature film career began. His notable television work includes the thriller State of Play, science fiction miniseries Frank Herbert's Children of Dune and the Channel 4 BAFTA Award-winning series Shameless.

He has performed in several West End productions and has received four nominations for the Laurence Olivier Award for Best Actor, and has also done voice work for animated films including Gnomeo & Juliet, its sequel Sherlock Gnomes, and Arthur Christmas.

In 2003, McAvoy appeared in a lead role in Bollywood Queen, then in another lead role as Rory in Inside I'm Dancing in 2004. This was followed by a supporting role, as the faun Mr. Tumnus, in The Chronicles of Narnia: The Lion, the Witch and the Wardrobe (2005). His performance in Kevin Macdonald's drama The Last King of Scotland (2006) garnered him several award nominations, including the BAFTA Award for Best Supporting Actor. The critically acclaimed romantic drama war film Atonement (2007) earned him a Golden Globe Award nomination and his second BAFTA nomination. He later appeared as a newly trained assassin in the action thriller Wanted (2008).

In 2011, McAvoy portrayed Professor Charles Xavier in the superhero film X-Men: First Class, a role he reprised in X-Men: Days of Future Past (2014), X-Men: Apocalypse (2016), Deadpool 2 (2018), and Dark Phoenix (2019). McAvoy starred in the crime comedy-drama film Filth (2013), for which he won Best Actor in the British Independent Film Awards. In 2016, he portrayed Kevin Wendell Crumb, a man with 23 alternate personalities, in M. Night Shyamalan's Split, for which he received critical acclaim, and later reprised the role for the sequel Glass (2019). Since 2019, he has portrayed Lord Asriel Belacqua in the BBC/HBO fantasy series His Dark Materials.

Early life
McAvoy was born on 21 April 1979 in Glasgow, to bus-driver-turned-builder James McAvoy Sr. and psychiatric nurse Elizabeth (née Johnstone; died 2018). He was brought up as a Roman Catholic. His parents separated when he was seven and divorced when he was eleven. McAvoy's mother suffered from poor health and subsequently sent him to live with his maternal grandparents, Mary and James Johnstone, in the nearby Drumchapel area of Glasgow. His mother lived with them intermittently. McAvoy has a younger sister named Joy and a younger half-brother named Donald. McAvoy confirmed in an interview with The Guardian that both his parents were deceased, but he had not been in contact with his father since childhood. He attended the Catholic St Thomas Aquinas Secondary School in the Jordanhill area of Glasgow and briefly considered joining the priesthood. In a 2006 interview, McAvoy said he considered becoming a priest as a child because it seemed to be a way to explore the world via missionary work. During his education, he worked at a local bakery.

McAvoy applied to join the Royal Navy and had already been accepted when he was also offered a place to study acting at the Royal Scottish Academy of Music and Drama (RSAMD, now the Royal Conservatoire of Scotland). After graduating in 2000, he moved to London.

Career

Early career
McAvoy's acting debut was at the age of 15 years in The Near Room (1995). He later admitted that he was not very interested in acting when joining the film, but was inspired to study acting after developing feelings for his co-star, Alana Brady. He continued to act while still a member of PACE Youth Theatre. McAvoy graduated from the Royal Scottish Academy of Music and Drama in 2000. Throughout the early 2000s, he made guest appearances in television shows and began working in film. In 2001, McAvoy's performance as a gay hustler in the play Out in the Open impressed director Joe Wright so much that Wright began offering McAvoy parts in his films. McAvoy kept declining them, however, and it was not until six years later that the two worked together.

He starred in Privates on Parade in the Donmar Warehouse, this time catching Sam Mendes' attention. In 2001, the actor appeared as Private James W. Miller in Band of Brothers, an eleven-hour World War II miniseries by executive producers Steven Spielberg and Tom Hanks. He gained the attention of critics in 2002's White Teeth, a four-part television drama miniseries adaption based on the novel of the same name by Zadie Smith. In 2022, McAvoy commented that Smith "didn’t say [he] was bad at playing the part". She told him he "was the wrong casting, because [he] was too little – the character should have been more overweight."

In 2003, McAvoy appeared in the Sci Fi Channel miniseries Frank Herbert's Children of Dune, adapted from Frank Herbert's novels. It is one of the highest-rated programmes on the channel. More work came for him when he accepted the role of an unprincipled reporter in 2003's State of Play. The well-received six-part drama serial tells the story of a newspaper's investigation into the death of a young woman and was broadcast on BBC One. Calling the programme a "must-see", the Chicago Tribune recommended State of Play for its cast's performance. In 2002, McAvoy shot scenes for Bollywood Queen, described as West Side Story meets Romeo and Juliet with bindis, the film deals with star-crossed lovers caught in the middle of clashing cultures; it was shown as a special presentation at the 2003 Sundance Film Festival and opened in UK cinemas on 17 October.

In 2004, he acted in the romantic comedy Wimbledon, also featuring Kirsten Dunst and Paul Bettany as leads. His next project was voicing a character named Hal in the 2004 English version of Strings, a mythic fantasy film. Another 2004 release for him was Inside I'm Dancing, an Irish production directed by Damien O'Donnell starring alongside fellow Scotsman Steven Robertson. In it, he was cast as one of the two principal characters: a maverick with duchenne muscular dystrophy. McAvoy ended 2004 by appearing in the first two series of Shameless as Steve McBride, the moral hero of the BAFTA-winning Channel 4 programme.

2000s 
His public profile was raised in 2005 with the release of Walt Disney Pictures's The Chronicles of Narnia: The Lion, the Witch and the Wardrobe. McAvoy starred in the fantasy adventure film made by Andrew Adamson and based on C. S. Lewis's children's novel as Tumnus, a faun who befriends Lucy Pevensie (played by Georgie Henley) and joins Aslan (Liam Neeson)'s forces. It was given a UK release of 9 December. At the UK box office, the film opened at number one, earning around £8.7 million at 498 cinemas over the weekend. Worldwide, Narnia grossed £463 million. In 2006 he accepted the principal role of Brian Jackson, a nerdy university student who wins a place on a University Challenge quiz team in the mid-1980s, in Starter for 10. He was directed by David Nicholls, who adapted the film's screenplay from his own book. The British-American production was given distribution in the UK on 10 November. In spite of the positive buzz, the film flopped at the box office, unable to recover its production costs of £5.7 million.

Forest Whitaker had suggested McAvoy to director Kevin Macdonald for the role of Nicholas Garrigan in 2006's Academy Award-winning low-budgeted The Last King of Scotland. McAvoy portrayed a Scottish doctor who becomes the personal physician to dictator Idi Amin (played by Whitaker) while in Uganda. While the film is based on factual events of Amin's rule, the details of the story and the character McAvoy played are fictional and adapted from Giles Foden's 1998 novel. McAvoy assessed his character to be a "completely selfish prick". An overwhelmed McAvoy fainted during his first take of what would be the hardest scene for him to shoot, Nicholas's torture. McAvoy was named Best Actor of the year by Scotland's own BAFTA Awards, where the film swept the major categories, and received a nomination for the BAFTA Award for Best Actor in a Supporting Role. The film received three awards, including the Outstanding British Film of the Year. This was accompanied by praise for McAvoy's performance.

Following that, he played Irish attorney Tom Lefroy and love-interest to Jane Austen in Becoming Jane, a 2007 historical film inspired by the author's early life. Next up was Penelope, which premiered at the 2006 Toronto International Film Festival. Also starring Christina Ricci, it generated polarised reviews. The breakthrough role in McAvoy's career came in Atonement, Joe Wright's 2007 adaptation of Ian McEwan's novel of the same title. A romantic war film, it focuses on lovers Cecilia and Robbie's (Keira Knightley and McAvoy) lives being torn apart after her jealous younger sister Briony (Saoirse Ronan) falsely accuses him of rape. Upon reading the script, McAvoy said he thought "If I don't get the part I'm not reading the book because it'll be devastating. It's an amazing role and I really wanted it." McAvoy has called the film "incredibly sad" but considers it an uplifting experience. He also shared that he hoped viewers will be left "absolutely devastated and harrowed". Screenings of Atonement were held at the 2007 Toronto International Film Festival, where it was one of the most acclaimed films present, and Venice Film Festival. Atonement was a big awards contender; it was nominated for fourteen BAFTAs and seven Academy Awards. Both McAvoy and Knightley were nominated for their performances at the 65th Golden Globe Awards, respectively. Additionally, the film was lauded by critics, with Metacritic reporting it to have an approval rating of 85. The Hollywood Reporter writer Ray Bennett said the duo gave "compelling and charismatic performances". In December 2022, McAvoy stated that McEwan was not entirely satisfied with his casting as Robbie in Atonement. "He wasn’t disparaging. He just gave me… nothing. And I was a bit devastated. Then he said I was a bit small – because my character, Robbie, was meant to be this 6ft tanned Adonis, and I was a 25-year-old pasty Glaswegian who’s 5ft-nothing."

His next role saw McAvoy starring with Angelina Jolie and Morgan Freeman in Wanted (2008), an action film where he portrayed Wesley Gibson, a young American slacker who learns he is heir to a legacy of assassins. When McAvoy screen-tested for the role, he was initially rejected because the studio was seeking an actor with conventional Hollywood leading-man looks and physique. He later recalled being considered the "runt of the litter" of those who tested, but ultimately got the role in late 2006 since the studio "wanted someone geeky". While shooting action scenes for Wanted, he suffered several injuries, including a twisted ankle and an injured knee. Nonetheless, the actor said he had a "good time" whilst making the film. McAvoy had not previously done this type of genre, and thought of Wanted as a chance to be more versatile.

Loosely based on the comic book miniseries of the same name by Mark Millar, it saw a June 2008 release worldwide. It received favourable reviews from the press, who generally liked that it was fast-paced. At the box office, Wanted was a success, grossing $341 million against a $75 million production budget. Next was The Last Station (2009), a biopic that details the final months of celebrated writer Leo Tolstoy and also stars Anne-Marie Duff, McAvoy's wife at the time. It was shown at a limited number of screens in the US. Although most critics' awards paid attention to co-stars Helen Mirren and Christopher Plummer, the Satellite Awards nominated McAvoy for Best Supporting Actor. In 2009, McAvoy voiced Angelina's father, Maurice Mouseling, in the television series, Angelina Ballerina: The Next Steps. He also appeared onstage in 2009 at Apollo Theatre's Three Days of Rain.

2010s 

He voiced the male titular character in the film Gnomeo & Juliet (2011), an animated movie based on William Shakespeare's play Romeo and Juliet. In Robert Redford's historical American drama The Conspirator, McAvoy played the role of an idealistic war hero who reluctantly defends co-conspirator Mary Surratt (Robin Wright) charged in the Abraham Lincoln assassination. It premiered at the 2010 Toronto International Film Festival. While this movie garnered mixed reception, critics lauded the actor for his work. In Owen Gleiberman's assessment of The Conspirator, he found it "stiff-jointed" and tedious, but regarded McAvoy as "an avid presence".

In mid-2010, McAvoy was cast as telepathic superhero Professor X, leader and founder of the X-Men, in X-Men: First Class. He joined an ensemble that included Michael Fassbender, Jennifer Lawrence and Nicholas Hoult. Based on the Marvel Comics and a prequel to the film series, it focuses on the relationship between Professor X and Magneto and the origin of their groups. McAvoy did not read comics as a child, but was a fan of the X-Men animated cartoon series. Released to the UK on 1 June, First Class topped its box office with ticket sales of around £5 million in its opening weekend. First Class was reviewed favourably and McAvoy's performance was widely praised. In 2011, he began filming the role of Max Lewinsky in the British thriller Welcome to the Punch. That same year, McAvoy voiced the title character in the animated holiday film Arthur Christmas. He also played the lead role in the Danny Boyle film Trance.

In 2012, McAvoy was cast as Bruce Robertson in Filth, an adaptation of the Irvine Welsh novel of the same name. The film's ensemble cast includes McAvoy's former classmate Shauna Macdonald as his wife, as well as Jamie Bell, Jim Broadbent, Eddie Marsan and Imogen Poots. For his role, McAvoy won Best Actor at the British Independent Film Awards in December 2013. It was also announced that he would co-star with Jessica Chastain in a double-feature film project, The Disappearance of Eleanor Rigby. He performed the male lead in radio play adaptation of Neverwhere written by Neil Gaiman. In October 2016 McAvoy played the character Richard in the BBC Radio 4 production of Neil Gaiman's short story 'How The Marquis Got His Coat Back'. Gaiman played the role of the Boatman.

McAvoy starred in Shakespeare's Macbeth on London's West End in early 2013. Macbeth was the first performance at the Trafalgar Transformed, running from 9 February until 27 April. The production was directed by Jamie Lloyd who also directed McAvoy in his last stint on the stage in 2009's Three Days of Rain. In 2015, McAvoy won the Best Actor award at London's Evening Standard Theater Awards for his portrayal of Jack Gurney in The Ruling Class, a revival of the Peter Barnes play directed by Jamie Lloyd. It ran at Trafalgar Studios from 16 January to 11 April 2015.

McAvoy reprised his role as Professor X in X-Men: Days of Future Past (2014), which grossed $747.9million worldwide, making it the sixth highest-grossing film of the year 2014 and the second highest-grossing film in the X-Men franchise and in 2016's X-Men: Apocalypse. In 2016, he starred in the M. Night Shyamalan thriller Split as Kevin Wendell Crumb, a dissociative identity disorder sufferer with dangerous capabilities. His performance was praised by critics, with some hailing it as the best of his career. In 2018, McAvoy voiced Hazel in the BBC miniseries Watership Down. In 2019, he reprised his role as Crumb in Glass and then returned as Professor X in the film Dark Phoenix.

McAvoy played the adult Bill Denbrough in the horror film It Chapter Two, the sequel to It (2017), which premiered on 6 September 2019 and grossed $473million at the box office. Also in 2019, McAvoy starred as Lord Asriel in the television adaptation of His Dark Materials.

2020s 
On 4 March 2020, it was announced that Audible would be adapting Neil Gaiman's acclaimed comic book series The Sandman into a multi-part audio drama, with McAvoy voicing the lead character, Dream. McAvoy starred in the Jaime Lloyd Company production of Cyrano de Bergerac which opened in the West End's Harold Pinter Theatre on February 3, 2022, for which he won a What’s On Stage award for Best Performer in a Male-Identifying Role. He continued his performance in a limited run at the Harvey Theater at Brooklyn Academy of Music (BAM), opening the show stateside on April 5, 2022, and running until May 22, 2022.

Personal life
While working on Shameless, McAvoy started a relationship with Anne-Marie Duff, who played his character's love interest; they married on 11 November 2006. They have a son together, born in 2010. On 13 May 2016, the couple jointly announced their decision to divorce. To minimise disruption to their son's life, they initially shared a home in North London when not working elsewhere. McAvoy confirmed in an interview to The Guardian in February 2022 that he had secretly married his partner Lisa Liberati after years of speculation. The couple met on the set of 2016 horror thriller Split. Liberati was working as a personal assistant to Split director M. Night Shyamalan at the time. The couple have one son together.

After McAvoy won the "Rising Star" award from the BAFTAs, his estranged father spoke to the Sunday Mirror, stating that he would love to get in touch with his son but did not know how to contact him. Although he did not read the piece, McAvoy heard about it and was unmoved.

McAvoy considers himself a spiritual person who no longer practises Catholicism. He enjoys fantasy themes, which he said started from age 11 with reading The Lord of the Rings.

McAvoy is a fan of Celtic FC, stating that his dream acting role would be Celtic player Jimmy Johnstone. He had once been a video game addict, playing role-playing games such as The Legend of Zelda, Secret of Mana, and The Elder Scrolls IV: Oblivion, which he quit after it began affecting his life. McAvoy recalled burning his disc of Oblivion with a kitchen stove to get rid of his addiction to the game.

Speaking to Sky News in 2011, McAvoy said he believed that British filmmakers belittle and dumb down their productions to please American audiences. He had previously called 3D films a "waste of money", accusing film studios of using the effect to get more money out of cinema audiences.

Philanthropy
In 2011, McAvoy did a "terrifying" BASE jump from the world's tallest hospital building in a bid to help raise money for Ugandan children's charity Retrak, which assists children on the streets. After this, he continued to support this Retrak. Additionally, he is a celebrity supporter of the British Red Cross with whom he travelled to Uganda to raise awareness of the projects there. He had become involved with the charity after shooting The Last King of Scotland there for several months and was shocked by what he saw. In February 2007, he visited northern Uganda and spent four days seeing projects supported by the British Red Cross.

In 2015, McAvoy pledged £125,000 to a 10-year scholarship programme at his former drama school, the Royal Conservatoire of Scotland. In March 2020, McAvoy donated £275,000 to a crowdfunding campaign to help the NHS mitigate the COVID-19 pandemic in the United Kingdom.

Acting credits

Awards and nominations

Notes

References

External links

 
 
 James McAvoy news coverage at The Guardian

1979 births
Living people
20th-century Scottish male actors
21st-century Scottish male actors
Alumni of the Royal Conservatoire of Scotland
Audiobook narrators
BAFTA Rising Star Award winners
Former Roman Catholics
Male actors from Glasgow
People educated at St Thomas Aquinas Secondary School, Glasgow
People from Crouch End
People from Port Glasgow
Scottish male film actors
Scottish male Shakespearean actors
Scottish male stage actors
Scottish male television actors
Scottish male voice actors
Chopard Trophy for Male Revelation winners